Orentius may refer to:
Orentius and Patientia (d. 240), Christian martyr and saint, father of St. Lawrence
Orentius (martyr) (d. 304), Roman soldier, Christian martyr and saint
Orientius (d. 439), Latin poet, Bishop of Auch and saint